Mrs. Butterworth's is an American brand of syrups and pancake mixes owned by Conagra Brands.  The syrups come in distinctive bottles shaped as the character "Mrs. Butterworth", represented in the form of a matronly woman. The syrup was introduced in 1961.  In 1999, the original glass bottles began to be replaced with plastic. In 2009, the character was given the first name "Joy" following a contest held by the company.

Advertising
One of the main voice actresses for Mrs. Butterworth was Mary Kay Bergman. she was also voiced by Hope Summers during the early to late 1970s.

Kim Fields appeared in a commercial for the product during the late-1970s. 

In 2007, Mrs. Butterworth was used in a series of ads for GEICO, in which she helped an actual customer with her testimonial.

In 2019, she appeared along with an actor playing Colonel Sanders in a KFC commercial spoofing a scene from Dirty Dancing, promoting chicken and waffles using Mrs. Butterworth's syrup.

Controversy

In 2020, following protests over systemic racism, Conagra Brands announced that it would review the shape of their bottles, as critics viewed them as an example of the "mammy" stereotype. A competing brand, Aunt Jemima, revamped its brand and advertising following the attention on negative black stereotypes. In ads, Mrs. Butterworth's voice has evoked a grandmotherly white woman, and she has been portrayed by white voice actresses.  Despite this, some reports had claimed, without citing any sources, that the character was originally modeled on Butterfly McQueen, a black actress who appeared as the maid in Gone with the Wind (1939).

In popular culture
In 2005, Chicago rapper Lupe Fiasco made reference to the brand on Kanye West's "Touch the Sky," with the lyric "bottle-shaped body like Mrs. Butterworth".

In 2009, then-parent company Pinnacle Foods held a "first name contest" for the product's spokesperson; the winning name was "Joy", making the full name Joy Butterworth. The character appears in the 2012 American film Foodfight!.

See also
 Aunt Jemima
 Breakfast
 French toast
 List of syrups
 Pancakes
 Waffles
 Betty Crocker

References

External links
 

Syrup
Baking mixes
Female characters in advertising
Food advertising characters
Products introduced in 1961
Pinnacle Foods brands
Race-related controversies in advertising and marketing